Drosophila elegans is a flower-feeding species of fruit flies, belonging to the family Drosophilidae. It is found in Taiwan and the Philippines in Asia.

It belongs to the Drosophila melanogaster species group where it forms its own subgroup. There are two morphs (brown and black) of the species. The difference is due to the percentages of 7-pentacosene and 9-pentacosene on the cuticle.

As a lab model species, it requires banana-opuntia-protein food. Its genome has been sequenced in 2011.

The name was also used for a fossil (†Drosophila elegans Statz, 1940) from the Upper Oligocene of the Rott Formation in Germany. The International Commission on Zoological Nomenclature ruled for the name to be conserved for the extant species by suppression of its unused senior homonym (replaced by †Drosophila statzi Ashburner and Bachli, 2006).

See also 
 List of Drosophila species
 List of sequenced animal genomes

References 

 Genetics of divergence in male wing pigmentation and courtship behavior between Drosophila elegans and D. gunungcola. SD Yeh, SR Liou, JR True, Heredity, 2006
 Incipient reproductive isolation between two morphs of Drosophila elegans (Diptera: Drosophilidae). Y Hirai, MT Kimura, Biological Journal of the Linnean Society, 1997

External links 

 
 
 Drosophila elegans at insectoid.info
 Husbandry Information for Drosophila elegans at the Drosophila Species Stock Center

elegans
Insects described in 1972
Insects of Taiwan
Insects of the Philippines
Diptera of Asia